Dawuth Dinkhet (born November 18, 1983) simply known as Wut is a Thai retired professional footballer who played as a left back.

External links

1983 births
Living people
Dawuth Dinkhet
Dawuth Dinkhet
Association football fullbacks
Dawuth Dinkhet
Dawuth Dinkhet
Dawuth Dinkhet
Dawuth Dinkhet